= Sven-Erik Sundberg =

Finnish footballer (1934–2017)

Personal information
- Date of birth: 9 November 1934
- Date of death: 23 August 2017 (aged 82)
- Position: Midfielder

International career
Years	Team	Apps	(Gls)
1957	Finland	1	(0)

Sven-Erik Sundberg (9 November 1934 – 23 August 2017) was a Finnish footballer who played as a midfielder. He made one appearance for the Finland national team in 1957.
